The 1995 European Cup was the 16th edition of the European Cup of athletics.

The Super League Finals were held in Villeneuve d'Ascq, France.

Super League
Held on 24 and 25 June in Villeneuve d'Ascq

Team standings

Spain was not relegated from the men's Super League as the host of the next edition.

Results summary

Men's events

Women's events

First League
The First League was held on 10 and 11 June

Men

Group 1
Held in Basel, Switzerland

Group 2
Held in Turku, Finland

Women

Group 1
Held in Basel, Switzerland

Group 2
Held in Turku, Finland

Second League
The Second League was held on 10 and 11 June

Men

Group 1
Held in Tallinn, Estonia

Group 2
Held in Velenje, Slovenia

Women

Group 1
Held in Tallinn, Estonia

Group 2
Held in Velenje, Slovenia

References

External links
European Cup results (Men) from GBR Athletics
European Cup results (Women) from GBR Athletics

European Cup (athletics)
European Cup
1995 in French sport
International athletics competitions hosted by France